Tangatarovo (Tañatar) is a rural locality (a village) and the administrative centre of Tangatarovsky Selsoviet, Burayevsky District, Bashkortostan, Russia. The population was 421 as of 2010. There are four streets.

Geography 
Tangatarovo is located 33 km southwest of Burayevo (the district's administrative centre) by road. Votkurzya is the nearest rural locality.

References 

Rural localities in Burayevsky District